Giorgi Gabunia (born 28 July 1975) is a Georgian journalist and host, son of Georgian actor and host Julieta Vashakmadze.

Career 
Currently he is host of program "Post Factum" on Mtavari Arkhi.

Assassination Attempt
The State Security Service of Georgia announced arrest of a Russian citizen on July 15, 2020 for an assassination attempt on Giorgi Gabunia, who had insulted Putin in past. Georgian media and Gabunia's boss later claimed the assassin was sent by Ramzan Kadyrov, who denied the allegations and said that if he had sent someone to kill, they would succeed. Kadyrov called Gabunia his enemy and said that he should beg for forgiveness by getting down on his knees, otherwise he would continue to remain one. Georgian authorities have not confirmed or denied the allegations against Kadyrov.

References 

Television journalists from Georgia (country)
Living people
1975 births